The El Cortez Hotel, at 239 W. 2nd St. in Reno, Nevada, is a historic Art Deco-style hotel that was designed by Reno architects George A. Ferris & Son and was built in 1931.  It was listed on the National Register of Historic Places in 1984.

It was deemed significant as a fine example of Art Deco architecture and of the work of the Ferris firm. Seven stories tall, it was the tallest building in Nevada until the completion of Reno's Mapes Hotel in 1947. It is decorated with low-relief terra cotta work. The Trocadero Casino was located inside the El Cortez from 1941 to 1951. For many years, the El Cortez still served as a hotel.

El Cortez was purchased by The Siegel Group in 2014.

References

External links 

Hotels in Reno, Nevada
Hotel buildings completed in 1931
Hotel buildings on the National Register of Historic Places in Nevada
National Register of Historic Places in Reno, Nevada
History of Reno, Nevada
Hotels established in 1931
1931 establishments in Nevada
Art Deco hotels
Art Deco architecture in Nevada